Heradsbygd Church is a parish church of the Church of Norway in Elverum Municipality in Innlandet county, Norway. It is located in the village of Heradsbygd. It is the church for the Heradsbygd parish which is part of the Sør-Østerdal prosti (deanery) in the Diocese of Hamar. The brown, wooden church was built in a long church design in the National Romantic style in 1895 using plans drawn up by the architect Henrik Bull. The church seats about 180 people.

History

In 1895, the architect Henrik Bull made designs for the building which was to become a prayer house for the village. It was designed in the National Romantic style. It was built using donations and gifts to fund the construction. Over time, more money was raised and in 1911 it was enlarged and consecrated as an annex chapel for the Elverum Church parish. More recently, the chapel was upgraded to parish church status.

See also
List of churches in Hamar

References

Elverum
Churches in Innlandet
Long churches in Norway
Wooden churches in Norway
19th-century Church of Norway church buildings
Churches completed in 1895
1895 establishments in Norway